Hamir Singh II (1762 – 6 January 1778) was the Maharana of Mewar Kingdom, Rajasthan, India (r. 1772–1778). He was a son of Maharana Ari Singh II. He died when a rifle burst in his hand at the age of just 16. After his death his younger brother Bhim Singh became the new ruler of Mewar.

References 

Mewar dynasty
1762 births
1778 deaths